Joseph Plains is a ghost town in Idaho County, Idaho, United States. It is near to Cottonwood, Idaho.

History 
The town was settled by Mr. and Mrs D.H. Boles to mine for gold. It then became a mining town, the town started losing residents in the 1930s because the gold rush was ending. It had a post office in 1922.

It had a population of 116 when the 1930 census was taken.

References 

Ghost towns in Idaho County, Idaho